Scytinostroma is a genus of fungi in the Lachnocladiaceae family. The genus contains 32 species that collectively have a widespread distribution. The genus was circumscribed by mycologist Marinus Anton Donk in 1956.

Species

References

Russulales
Russulales genera
Taxa named by Marinus Anton Donk